Vitus-Gregory Gondwe is a Malawian journalist, editor and media consultant. He also runs his own social, music and business analysis blog. He is known for his investigative stories. He also writes on Business news. He has been a contributor to several newspapers in Malawi, and has worked for the Malawi Broadcasting Corporation as correspondent. He is a Malawi correspondent for the Associated Press, as well as a regular correspondent for BizCommunity and BiztechAfrica. He has contributed to a number of news sources worldwide since 1993. He also regularly writes about freedom of Press and the media industry.

Career
Until February 2016 he was the Chief Reporter as well as the Bureau Chief for Times Media Group, which owns Blantyre Newspapers Limited (BNL Times), having been promoted in April 2014 from the position of senior reporter. His speciality is investigative and exclusive stories.

He is currently studying with the University of Malawi where he is pursuing a BA in Journalism. He has a diploma and an intermediate certificate in journalism. He started journalism in 1993 and has since made contributions to African News Dimension network, CNN, and Southern Times (Namibia), The Nation and The Daily Times, Malawi News, and The Weekend Nation. 
He was a reporter for The Chronicle Newspaper in Malawi until 2005. He worked as Regional Editor and Northern Region Bureau Chief for Zodiak Broadcasting Station from 2007- 2010.

Mutharika administration journalism attacks
Gondwe became the target of national (and international) interest during the journalistic crackdown during 2011-2012 when President Bingu wa Mutharika was in his final term. Minister of Information Patricia Kaliati threatened him over the phone due to an article he wrote that included her. Kaliati attacked a cabinet minister assessment published b The Daily Times that he had written about. She called him over the phone to warn him not to write about her again in a negative light or face unspecified consequences. This led the Media Institute of Southern Africa (MISA) to release a statement in his favor asking the Minister to address the organization directly with reporting discrepancies. The World Media body also wrote to Bingu wa Mutharika with regards to this threat. This case was cited in protest letters against press freedom to Bingu Wa Mutharika.

References

Malawian journalists
Malawian columnists
Malawian non-fiction writers
1974 births
Living people
21st-century Malawian writers
People from Mulanje District